Zindanmuruqqışlaq (also, Zindanmurugkyshlak) is a village and municipality in the Qusar Rayon of Azerbaijan.  It has a population of 434.

References 

Populated places in Qusar District